Digitalis Ambigua: Gold & Poison is the fifth album by the band SPK. Half of the tracks can be found on their previous record, Zamia Lehmanni.

Track listing
 "Breathless" - 4:50
 "Mouth to Mouth" - 5:50
 "Sheer Naked Aggression" - 4:12
 "Crack!" - 5:30
 "The Doctrine of Eternal Ice" - 4:24
 "Invocation" - 5:09
 "White Island" - 5:29
 "Palms Crossed in Sorrow" - 5:02
 "Alocasia Metallica" - 5:50
 "The Garden of Earthly Delights" - 3:13

Personnel
Graeme Revell - Producer, Instrumentalist, Vocals
Karina Hayes - Vocals
Sinan Leong - Vocals

References

1987 albums
SPK (band) albums
Nettwerk Records albums